Matjaž Mulej (born Maribor, 20 January 1941) is a Slovenian academic.

Personal life 

He has a B.A. in economic analysis, a M.A. in Development Economics, as well as Doctorates in Economics/Systems Theory, and in Management/Innovation Management.

He has been married for more than 50 years and has two adult children and four grandchildren.

Career 

He retired from University of Maribor as Professor Emeritus in Systems and Innovation Theory. He has more than 1,600 publications in more than 40 countries. He has more than 60 publications and close to 400 citations. He was visiting professor abroad for 15 semesters - including Cornell University and other Universities in Austria, China, Germany, Mexico and USA. He has served as consultant or speaker in/for enterprises - about 500 times in six countries.

Bibliography 

 Dialectical Systems Theory
 Innovative Business Paradigm for countries/enterprises 
 Methods of creative interdisciplinary cooperation

Recognition 

Mulej was nominated to become a member of the New York Academy of Sciences in 1996, the European Academy of Sciences and Arts, Salzburg (2004), the European Academy of Sciences, Arts and Humanities, Paris in 2004 and the International Academy for Systems and Cybernetic Sciences in 2010. He served as the President of the latter until 2012. He was President of the International Federation for Systems Research from 2006 to 2010.

He received many rewards for his work on the systems approach to innovation in Yugoslavia, Slovenia, Maribor and University of Maribor.

References

Living people
1941 births
Academic staff of the University of Maribor
20th-century Slovenian economists
Yugoslav economists
21st-century Slovenian economists